Eén (stylized as één) is a public Dutch-language TV station in Belgium, owned by the VRT, which also owns Ketnet, Canvas and several radio stations. Although the channel is commercial-free, short sponsorship messages are broadcast in between some programmes.

Eén focuses on drama, entertainment, news and current affairs in a similar vein to BBC One in the United Kingdom. The station was formerly known as VRT TV1 until the current Eén branding was launched as part of a major station revamp on 21 January 2005, with a look created by BBC Broadcast.

Eén is the equivalent of its French-language counterpart, La Une, the first channel of the Belgian Francophone broadcaster, RTBF.

On-screen presentation

Continuity
With its sister channel Ketnet, Eén was one of 21 stations in Europe to utilise in-vision continuity presentation. Four regular staff announcers (as of January 2014) were presenting in-vision and out-of-vision links from lunchtime until around midnight or in the early hours (if necessary) each day.

The last team of announcers was composed of:
Andrea Croonenberghs (senior announcer)
Geena Lisa Peeters
Eva Daeleman
Saartje Vandendriessche
The in-vision presentation was ditched on 26 July 2015. Since that day, it is replaced by out-of-vision continuity.

Seasonal identity
As of its 2007 rebrand as één, the channel uses different idents, logos, blips and a different colour scheme every season. This seasonality concept was abolished when Eén got a new look, created by Gédéon Programmes, in early 2009.

Logo history

Programming
Foreign language programmes and segments of local TV programmes with foreign language dialogue (e.g. interviews with people speaking in other languages) are shown with Dutch subtitles.

Belgian

1000 Zonnen
Blokken
Dans Mondial
Debby and Nancy's Happy Hour
De bedenkers
De Laaste Show
De Pappenheimers
De Rode Loper
De Slimste Mens ter Wereld
De Zevende Dag
Eurosong
Fata Morgana
F.C. De Kampioenen
Gentse Waterzooi
Koppen
Man Bijt Hond
Peter Live
Professor T.
Salamander
Sorry voor alles
Sportweekend
Studio 1
Thuis
Tomtesterom
Tour
Villa Politica
Vlaanderen Vakantieland
Volt
VRT NWS Journaal
Witse

International

'Allo 'Allo
3rd Rock from the Sun
Agatha Christie's Poirot
Are You Being Served?
Bergerac
The Bill
The Border
Desperate Housewives
Doc Martin
Doctor Who
Downton Abbey
How to Get Away with Murder
The Last Ship
Married... with Children
MasterChef
MasterChef Australia
Merseybeat
Midsomer Murders
Miranda
The Missing
Monarch of the Glen
The Musketeers
The Nanny
Neighbours
The Player
Primeval
Psi Factor
The Saint
Scott & Bailey
Sea Patrol
S1NGLE
Sold
Versailles
Victoria

Teletext
VRT offered a teletext service as of 8 May 1980 which was stopped on 1 June 2016. The page 888 is still available for subtitles. The service was used by 576,094 persons per day in 2010. The number dropped down to 123,709 in 2014.

References

External links
 

1953 establishments in Belgium
Dutch-language television networks
Television channels in Belgium
Television channels in Flanders
Television channels and stations established in 1953